The 1930 Colorado gubernatorial election was held on November 4, 1930. Incumbent Democrat Billy Adams defeated Republican nominee Robert F. Rockwell with 60.41% of the vote.

Primary elections
Primary elections were held on September 9, 1930.

Democratic primary

Candidates
Billy Adams, incumbent Governor

Results

Republican primary

Candidates
Robert F. Rockwell, former Lieutenant Governor

Results

General election

Candidates
Major party candidates
Billy Adams, Democratic
Robert F. Rockwell, Republican

Other candidates
Claud A. Bushnell, Socialist
Lizabeth A. Williams, Farmer–Labor 
William R. Dietrich, Communist
Walter Moore, Independent
Perry M. Jones, Independent

Results

References

1930
Colorado
Gubernatorial
November 1930 events